The Oakland Athletics' 1986 season was a season in American baseball. It involved the A's finishing 3rd in the American League West with a record of 76 wins and 86 losses.

Offseason
November 13, 1985: Bárbaro Garbey was traded by the Detroit Tigers to the Oakland Athletics for Dave Collins.
 December 10, 1985: Mike Heath and Tim Conroy were traded by the Athletics to the St. Louis Cardinals for Joaquín Andújar.
 January 17, 1986: Phil Stephenson and Bob Bathe (minors) were traded by the Athletics to the Chicago Cubs for Gary Jones (minors) and John Cox (minors).
February 1, 1986: Lenn Sakata was signed as a free agent with the Oakland Athletics. 
March 21, 1986: Bárbaro Garbey was released by the Oakland Athletics.
 March 30, 1986: Charlie O'Brien, Steve Kiefer, Mike Fulmer (minors) and Pete Kendrick (minors) were traded by the Athletics to the Milwaukee Brewers for Moose Haas.

Regular season
 August 22, 1986: Mark McGwire made his major league debut against the New York Yankees. He had three at-bats and no hits.  Three days later, McGwire hit his first major league home run off Walt Terrell of the Detroit Tigers in an 8-4 win.
 September 12, 1986: In a game against the Cleveland Indians, Terry Steinbach hit a home run in his first Major League at-bat. Steinbach became the 54th player to achieve the feat.

Season standings

Record vs. opponents

Notable transactions
 April 4, 1986: Jerry Willard was signed as a free agent by the Athletics.
May 20, 1986: Keith Atherton was traded by the Oakland Athletics to the Minnesota Twins for a player to be named later and cash. The Minnesota Twins sent Eric Broersma (minors) (May 23, 1986) to the Oakland Athletics to complete the trade.
 May 23, 1986: Dave Stewart was signed as a free agent with the Oakland Athletics.
 June 1, 1986: Dave Von Ohlen was purchased by the Athletics from the Miami Marlins.
 July 10, 1986: Mike Bordick was signed by the Athletics as an amateur free agent.
 July 10, 1986: Ozzie Canseco was signed as a free agent by the Oakland Athletics.
 July 18, 1986: Rick Langford was released by the Athletics.

Draft picks
 June 2, 1986: Bret Barberie was drafted by the Athletics in the 1st round (22nd pick) of the 1986 Major League Baseball draft (Secondary Phase), but did not sign.

Roster

Player stats

Batting

Starters by position
Note: Pos = Position; G = Games played; AB = At bats; H = Hits; Avg. = Batting average; HR = Home runs; RBI = Runs batted in

Other batters
Note: G = Games played; AB = At bats; H = Hits; Avg. = Batting average; HR = Home runs; RBI = Runs batted in

Pitching

Starting pitchers 
Note: G = Games pitched; IP = Innings pitched; W = Wins; L = Losses; ERA = Earned run average; SO = Strikeouts

Other pitchers 
Note: G = Games pitched; IP = Innings pitched; W = Wins; L = Losses; ERA = Earned run average; SO = Strikeouts

Relief pitchers 
Note: G = Games pitched; W = Wins; L = Losses; SV = Saves; ERA = Earned run average; SO = Strikeouts

Awards and honors
 José Canseco, American League Rookie of the Year
 Dave Kingman, American League Record, Most Home Runs in the Final Season of a Career (35)

Farm system

References

External links
1986 Oakland Athletics at Baseball Reference
1986 Oakland Athletics at Baseball Almanac

Oakland Athletics seasons
Oakland Athletics season
Oak